Hakim Nassari; is an Iranian football forward who currently plays for Naft Masjed Soleyman in the Persian Gulf Pro League.

Club career

Foolad
Nassari joined Foolad in summer 2011 with a 3-year contract. He made his debut for Foolad against Shahin Bushehr on August 2, 2011 as a starter. In his first season at Foolad, he was usually  used as a regular starter. Nassari finished the season with 30 appearances and 4 goals. In his second season in Foolad he mostly benched and just made 5 appearances.

Paykan (loan)
In winter 2013 he joined Paykan until the end of the season on loan from Foolad. He finished the season with 15 appearances but he couldn't help Paykan to escape from relegation.

Naft Masjed Soleyman
Nassari joined Naft Masjed Soleyman in summer 2013. He helped Naft win promotion to Pro League while he scored 7 times in 21 matches.

Saipa
After shining in the Azadegan League, he reunited with his former coach at Foolad, Majid Jalali. He made his debut for Saipa in a match against his former club, Naft MIS in season debut as a starter.

Club career statistics

Honours 
Esteghlal Khuzestan
Iran Pro League (1): 2015–16

References

External links
 Hakim Nasari at PersianLeague.com
 Hakim Nassari at IranLeague.ir

1986 births
Living people
Iranian footballers
Naft Masjed Soleyman F.C. players
Foolad FC players
Paykan F.C. players
Saipa F.C. players
Esteghlal Khuzestan players
Sanat Naft Abadan F.C. players
Persian Gulf Pro League players
Sportspeople from Khuzestan province
Association football forwards